Royal Kent may refer to:

The Queen's Own Buffs, The Royal Kent Regiment
The Royal Kent Church of England Primary School in Oxshott, Surrey
Royal Kent, an English manufacturer of bone china
The Royal Kent bugle, a 19th-century keyed variant of the brass instrument